The Swedish Ardennes is a medium-size, heavyweight draft horse. It was bred in Sweden during the late 19th century to satisfy farmers' demand for horses suitable for agriculture.

Characteristics 

The Swedish Ardennes is } and weighs . It has a small, heavy head for its size with small eyes; a short, thick neck; a short back with a wide chest, and well-muscled shoulders. The Swedish Ardennes has a muscular, compact body with stout legs, some feathering on its legs and blue, open hoofs. The predominant colors are black, blood bay, and chestnut. It can withstand extremes in weather; Swedish Ardennes horses are very strong and willing workers and easy keepers. They are also known for their longevity, an even but not sluggish temperament, and good overall health.

History

Swedish Ardennes horses were developed by crossing imported Ardennes horses (a heavy draft breed from Belgium and northern France) with the North Swedish Horse. In 1872, Count C.G. Wrangel began importing Ardennes horses and by 1880, Ardennes imports and crossbreds had made inroads across south and central Sweden. The goal was to improve on the size and strength of native Swedish horses; to this end, a studbook was established in 1901.

Uses 

Although farming is now done with machinery (except on remote hill farms), the Swedish Ardennes is still popular as a cart horse; it is also used for hauling timber in mountain areas inaccessible by machinery. Despite the increasing mechanization of agriculture and forestry, the Swedish Ardennes still makes up the largest proportion of Sweden's registered purebred stallions.

References

Horse breeds
Horse breeds originating in Sweden